Cara Black and Arina Rodionova were the defending champions, having won the previous edition in 2012. However Black retired from professional tennis in 2015 and Rodionova chose to compete at the 2022 Melbourne Summer Set instead.

Emina Bektas and Tara Moore won the title, defeating Catherine Harrison and Aldila Sutjiadi in the final, 0–6, 7–6(7–1), [10–8].

Seeds

Draw

Draw

References

External Links
Main Draw

Traralgon International - Doubles